The 2009 Kenyan Premier League was the sixth season of the Kenyan Premier League since it started in 2003 and the forty-sixth season of top division football in Kenya since 1963. It began on 7 February with Agrochemical and Red Berets and ended on 21 November with Sony Sugar and Western Stima.

Sofapaka had an alarmingly remarkable season, having just been promoted from the Nationwide League for the first time and immediately winning the title. They also won the Kenyan Super Cup the following season.

Bandari and Agrochemical were relegated at the end of the season after replacing previously relegated Mahakama and Mathare Youth. However, Bandari gained promotion again for the 2011 season.

Changes from last season
Relegated from Premier League
 Mahakama
 Mathare Youth

Promoted from Nationwide League
 A.F.C. Leopards
 Sofapaka

Teams

Stadia and locations

League table

Results

See also
 2009 Kenyan Super Cup
 Kenyan football in 2009

References

Kenya
Kenyan
Kenya
Kenyan
1
2009